Abernathy is an unincorporated community in Cleburne County, Alabama, United States

Demographics

Abernathy Precinct (1880-1950)

Abernathy village has never reported a population figure separately on the U.S. Census as an unincorporated community. However, the 8th beat/precinct of Cleburne County bore its name from 1880 to 1950. In the 1930 and 1940 returns, when the census recorded racial statistics for the precincts, both times reported a White majority for the precinct. In 1960, the precincts were merged and/or reorganized into census divisions (as part of a general reorganization of counties) and it was consolidated into the census division of Ranburne.

References

Unincorporated communities in Cleburne County, Alabama
Unincorporated communities in Alabama